Critica fascista was a biweekly cultural magazine which was founded and edited by Giuseppe Bottai in Rome, Italy. The magazine existed during the Fascist rule in the country from 1923 to 1943. Over time it became one of the most significant publications of the fascist period in Italy.

History and profile
Critica fascista was founded in 1923 by Italian journalist Giuseppe Bottai in Rome. It was published on a biweekly basis and edited by Giuseppe Bottai during its lifetime. The goal of Bottai was to provide a platform for the Fascist government to develop a cultural policy through intellectual and artistic discussions. The magazine also aimed at educating the emerging ruling class and at initiating a discussion on the nature of Fascist ideology.

Between 1926 and 1927 Critica fascista published various articles on the definition and scope of the state art which attempted to help the Fascist authorities in developing the related concepts. The contributors of these discussions included Ardengo Soffici, Mino Maccari, Gino Severini, Massimo Bontempelli, Cipriano Efisio Oppo, Curzio Malaparte, Filippo Tommaso Marinetti, Anton Giulio Bragaglia, Umberto Fracchia and Emilio Cecchi. In the early 1930s Giuseppe Bottai and other Fascist figures frequently published articles in the magazine about the need for the modernization in all aspects of Italian life.

Critica fascista folded in 1943, and the last issue was number 21.

References

1923 establishments in Italy
1943 disestablishments in Italy
Antisemitism in Italy
Antisemitic publications
Biweekly magazines published in Italy
Defunct political magazines published in Italy
Fascist newspapers and magazines
Italian-language magazines
Magazines established in 1923
Magazines disestablished in 1943
Magazines published in Rome
Propaganda newspapers and magazines